The European Union-Mediterranean Free Trade Area (EU-MED FTA, EMFTA), also called the Euro-Mediterranean Free Trade Area or Euromed FTA, is based on the Barcelona Process and European Neighbourhood Policy (ENP). The Barcelona Process, developed after the Barcelona Conference in successive annual meetings, is a set of goals designed to lead to a free trade area in the Mediterranean Region and the Middle East by 2010.

A Regional Convention on pan-Euro-Mediterranean preferential Rules of Origin was signed in June 2011 to allow identical rules of origin across the region.
The convention was in force from May 2012 and is the last step taken in the Barcelona Process so far.

History

The Agadir Agreement of 2004 (FTA between Jordan, Tunisia, Morocco, Egypt) is seen as its first building block. Further steps are envisioned into the ENP Action plans negotiated between the European Union and the partner states on the southern shores of the Mediterranean Sea, mostly with Arab League member states.

The initial aim is to create a matrix of Free Trade Agreements between each of the partners and the others. Then a single free trade area is to be formed, including the European Union.

Partners 
 European Union
 Morocco (member of the Arab League and the Arab Maghreb Union)
 Algeria (member of the Arab League and the Arab Maghreb Union)
 Tunisia (member of the Arab League and the Arab Maghreb Union)
 Egypt (member of the Arab League)
 Jordan (member of the Arab League)
 Lebanon (member of the Arab League)
 Israel
 Palestinian National Authority (Member of the Arab League)
 Turkey

Prospective partners 
 Syria (Member of the Arab League)
 Libya (member of the Arab League and the Arab Maghreb Union)
 Gulf Cooperation Council
 Iraq (Member of the Arab League)
 Mauritania (member of the Arab League and the Arab Maghreb Union)

FTA Progress

See also 

 African Economic Community
 Economic integration
 EUR.1 movement certificate
 List of free trade agreements
 List of trade blocs
 Middle East economic integration
 Stability Pact for South Eastern Europe
 Union for the Mediterranean
 US-Middle East Free Trade Area (US-MEFTA)

References

External links 
General overviews
 Euro-Mediterranean Association Agreements, Summaries of EU Legislation, EU website, 2007. Consulted 4 September 2010.
 System of Pan-Euro-Mediterranean Cumulation, European Commission Taxation and Customs Union page. Consulted 4 September 2010.
 Euro-Med free trade area: the benefits of cumulation, EFTA Bulletin, Switzerland, July–August 2006. Consulted 4 September 2010.

More specific studies
 European Union–Developing Country FTAs: Overview and Analysis, by JOSEPH F. FRANCOIS, MATTHEW MCQUEEN and GANESHAN WIGNARAJA, in "World Development" Vol. 33, No. 10, pp. 1545–1565, 2005, Elsesvier Ltd, UK.
 Euro-Mediterranean Free Trade Area – Is It Time to Be Optimistic about the Future?, by Eylin Ege on the IEMed Observatory website, Barcelona, no date. Consulted 4 September 2010.
 The Euro-Mediterranean Free Trade Area and its Impact on the Economies Involved, by Nicola Minasi, Rome, no date. Consulted 4 September 2010.
 THE EUROMEDITERRANEAN FREE TRADE AREA: FROM COMPETITION TO INTEGRATION, by Alejandro Lorca and Gonzalo Escribano, Madrid, no date. Consulted 4 September 2010.

Economy of the European Union
Euromediterranean Partnership
Trade blocs
Proposed free trade agreements
Free-trade areas